Karl Ernst Osthaus (15 April 1874, in Hagen – 25 March 1921, in Merano) was an important German patron of avant-garde art and architecture.

Life 
Osthaus was born to a wealthy banking family, who also owned several businesses in the textile and metalwork industries. Initially, his father wanted him to go into the family business but owing to a nervous breakdown, Karl went into academics. When he was 22, he received an inheritance from his grandparents which allowed him to pursue his interest in starting a museum.

In 1902, Osthaus founded the Folkwang Museum in Hagen, Germany. After his death, the city of Hagen was unable to purchase the museum collection and in 1922 Hagen was outbid by the neighbouring city of Essen which now houses the Folkwang Collection.  A separate museum survives in Hagen, the Karl Ernst Osthaus-Museum.

Osthaus was a notable patron of the European avant-garde. Although in his early life he tended to German nationalism, active in the Alldeutscher Verband, the Pan-German League, and supporting figures such as the Austrian Georg von Schönerer, Osthaus's nationalism became tempered with interest in transforming Hagen and Germany into the leading centers of the European avant-garde. Under the guidance of Henry van de Velde, Osthaus began a collection of European modernist painting that comprised one of the first purely modernist collections to be open to the public. The Folkwang in Hagen sponsored some of the earliest exhibits of Expressionist painting, and the collection early on included works by Ernst Ludwig Kirchner, Emil Nolde, and Christian Rohlfs and work by non-German artists such as Aristide Maillol, Johan Thorn Prikker, and Henri Matisse.

Osthaus also attempted to spark interest in avant-garde architecture in Hagen. In this regard, he encountered many frustrations. In some ways, the story of the projects that were not built is more interesting than the projects that were built. Major architects including Henry van de Velde, Richard Riemerschmid, Peter Behrens, and Walter Gropius were all active in Hagen. A small artist colony also emerged including the sculptor Milly Steger, the Dutch artist and theosophist J.L.M. Lauweriks, and a score of figures important for Hagen's local cultural history.

Osthaus's Jugendstil villa, the Hohenhof, is one of the most important examples of bourgeois Jugendstil architecture in Europe. It was recently renovated and is open to the public.

References

External links  
  

1874 births
1921 deaths
People from Hagen
People from the Province of Westphalia
German art collectors
19th-century art collectors
20th-century art collectors
Museum founders